Raimo Vīgants (born 25 February 1999) is a Latvian cross-country skier who competes internationally.
 
He represented Latvia at the 2022 Winter Olympics.

Cross-country skiing results
All results are sourced from the International Ski Federation (FIS).

Olympic Games

Distance reduced to 30 km due to weather conditions.

World Championships

World Cup

Season standings

References

Living people
1999 births
Latvian male cross-country skiers
Cross-country skiers at the 2022 Winter Olympics
Olympic cross-country skiers of Latvia
Cross-country skiers at the 2016 Winter Youth Olympics